A personal area network (PAN) is a computer network for interconnecting electronic devices  within an individual person's workspace. A PAN provides data transmission among devices such as computers, smartphones, tablets and personal digital assistants. PANs can be used for communication among the personal devices themselves, or for connecting to a higher level network and the Internet where one master device takes up the role as gateway. 

A PAN may be wireless or carried over wired interfaces such as USB. A wireless personal area network (WPAN) is a PAN carried over a low-powered, short-distance wireless network technology such as IrDA, Wireless USB, Bluetooth or Zigbee. The reach of a WPAN varies from a few centimeters to a few meters. WPANs specifically tailored for low-power operation of the sensors are sometimes also called low-power personal area network (LPPAN) to better distinguish them from low-power wide-area network (LPWAN).

Wired
Wired personal area networks provide short connections between peripherals. Example technologies include USB, IEEE 1394 and Thunderbolt.

Wireless
A wireless personal area network (WPAN) is a personal area network in which the connections are wireless. IEEE 802.15 has produced standards for several types of PANs operating in the ISM band including Bluetooth. The Infrared Data Association (IrDA) has produced standards for WPANs that operate using infrared communications.

Bluetooth
Bluetooth uses short-range radio waves. Uses in a WPAN include, for example, Bluetooth devices such as keyboards, pointing devices, audio headsets, and printers that may connect to smartwatches, cell phones, or computers. A Bluetooth WPAN is also called a piconet, and is composed of up to 8 active devices in a master-slave relationship (a very large number of additional devices can be connected in "parked" mode). The first Bluetooth device in the piconet is the master, and all other devices are slaves that communicate with the master.

With Bluetooth mesh networking the range and number of devices is extended by using mesh networking techniques to relay information from one device to another. Such a network doesn't have a master device and may or may not be treated as a WPAN.

IrDA
IrDA uses infrared light, which has a frequency below the human eye's sensitivity. Infrared is used in other wireless communications applications, for instance, in remote controls. Typical WPAN devices that use IrDA include printers, keyboards, and other serial communication interfaces.

See also

 Ambient networks
 DASH7
 6LoWPAN
 IEEE 802.15
 Internalnet
 Low-rate wireless personal area network
 Microchip implant (human)
 RuBee
 Ultra-wideband and FM-UWB networks
 Wireless ad hoc network (WANET)
 Z-Wave

References

External links

IEEE 802.15 Working Group for WPAN

Personal area networks
Bluetooth